The Walled Lake Consolidated School District is a school district with its headquarters in the Educational Services Center in Walled Lake, Michigan in Greater Detroit. The district has 12 elementary schools, four middle schools, and three high schools which serve over 14,000 children.

Its service area includes all or portions of cities of Farmington Hills, Novi, Orchard Lake, Walled Lake and Wixom, the townships of Commerce, West Bloomfield and White Lake, and the village of Wolverine Lake.

As of 2010 it is the largest school district in Oakland County, Michigan, with 15,600 students and 1,600 employees.

History

In the 2000s the State of Michigan requested that the district buy land in an area in Commerce Township. In February 2004 the district filed an application with the Michigan Department of Natural Resources proposing to purchase  of land along Wise Road in the township. In response, a land conservation group attempted to stop the efforts.

In 2010 the district reported having a potential deficit of $22.7 million for the 2010–2011 school year. The district proposed a deficit reduction plan which proposed privatizing transportation and custodial services and laying off 300 district employees, including teachers.

In 2017, the school board voted to close the Community Education Center due to increased costs and decreased funding from the state. The district at the time was also completing the Safety, Security and Technology Bond, that was approved by voters in 2014. When it became time to renovate the Community Education Center, it was determined that due to the age and functions of the building, it would not be fiscally-responsible to complete the projects for that building. As of the beginning of the 2017–2018 school year, the district moved all of the Community Education Center offices to the Educational Services Center. The City of Walled Lake filed  lawsuit against the school district to prevent it from being demolished, which the district had gone out to bid for. City officials cited that the building is a landmark in the city, being built in the early 1920s, and many residents were concerned about the new use on that property if sold to a private developer. In spite of this, demolition of the Community Education Center was completed in late 2018. The area in the heart of Walled Lake is currently still empty as of June 2021.

Schools

Preschools
 Twin Suns Preschool (Wixom)
 Dublin Early Childhood Wing (White Lake Township) – to be opened in 2022 as a wing of the new Dublin Elementary, approved as part of the 2019 Buildings, Infrastructure, & Equity Bond
 Early Childhood Center (Novi) – to be opened in 2023, approved as part of the 2019 Buildings, Infrastructure, & Equity Bond

Elementary schools
 Commerce Elementary School (Commerce Township)
 Dublin Elementary School (White Lake Township)
 Glengary Elementary School (Commerce Township)
 Mary Helen Guest Elementary School (Walled Lake)
 Hickory Woods Elementary (Novi)
 Keith Elementary (West Bloomfield)
 Loon Lake Elementary (Wixom)
 Meadowbrook Elementary (Novi)
 Oakley Park Elementary (Commerce Township)
 Pleasant Lake Elementary (West Bloomfield)
 In 2000 it had 600 students, with 20% of them being ethnically Japanese.
 Walled Lake Elementary (Commerce Township)
 Wixom Elementary (Wixom)

Middle schools
 Clifford Smart Middle School (Commerce Township)
 James R. Geisler Middle School (Commerce Township)
 Sarah Banks Middle School (Wixom)
 Walnut Creek Middle School (West Bloomfield)

High schools
 Walled Lake Central High School (Commerce Township)
 Walled Lake Northern High School (Commerce Township)
 Walled Lake Western High School (Commerce Township)

Other facilities
 Educational Services Center (Walled Lake) – District headquarters
 Operations Facility (Commerce Township)
 Outdoor Education Center (Commerce Township)

Defunct schools
 Community Education Center (Walled Lake)
 Maple Elementary (West Bloomfield)
 Twin Beach Elementary School (West Bloomfield)
 Union Lake Elementary School (Commerce Township)

References

External links 

 
 Map of the school district – Michigan Center for Geographic Information (CGI) – Alternate map image

School districts in Michigan
Education in Oakland County, Michigan
Farmington Hills, Michigan
Novi, Michigan
1950s establishments in Michigan